Boy bishop is the title of a tradition in the Middle Ages, whereby a boy was chosen, for example among cathedral choristers, to parody the adult Bishop, commonly on the feast of Holy Innocents on 28 December. This tradition links with others, such as the Feast of Fools and the Feast of Asses.

History

In England, the boy bishop was elected on 6 December, the feast of Saint Nicholas, the patron saint of children, and his authority lasted through Holy Innocents' day (28 December). The adult Bishop, symbolically, steps down at the deposuit potentes de sede of the Magnificat ("he hath put down the mighty from their seat"), and the boy takes his seat at et exaltavit humiles ("and hath exalted the humble and meek").

After the election, the boy dressed in full bishop's robes with mitre and crozier, and, attended by other boys dressed as priests, made a circuit of the town blessing the people. Typically the boy Bishop and his minions took possession of the cathedral and performed all the ceremonies and offices, except Mass. This custom spread to many parishes.

Notwithstanding the intervention of various Church authorities (see Feast of Fools), the popularity of the custom made it resilient. In England, it was abolished by Henry VIII in 1542, revived by Mary I in 1552, and, finally, abolished by Elizabeth I. This tradition continued among Germans, in the so-called  probably founded by Gregory IV. This tradition continues in Spain. This tradition includes many time-honored legends, such as recognizing a mini-effigy in Salisbury Cathedral as a boy Bishop; however, this is likely a tertiary burial of removed organs (sexual organs or viscera) of an adult Bishop. According to rumors, they may belong to Richard Poore.

Revivals
The English-speaking world enjoy many versions, including Hereford, revived in 1973 for a special children's service, with both full and traditional ceremonies following annually since 1982.  The Boy Bishop preaches a sermon and leads prayers at Diocesan Advent services. Another revival in 1959 was at St George's Parish Church, Stockport. These ceremonies are also at Westminster Cathedral, Salisbury Cathedral, and churches throughout England, including All Saints' Church, Northampton, Claines, Worcestershire, and St Christopher's Parish Church, Bournemouth, (early 1950s). There, the Boy Bishop was installed on St Christopher's Day, (July 25), and 'reigned' for one year, preaching and 'presiding' at youth events. The market town of Alcester, Warwickshire has St Nicholas night complete with the Boy Bishop on 6 December each year.

The tradition continues in Burgos, Spain. There, the boy-bishop feast is extremely popular before the cathedral choir. After its re-establishment, the boy bishop was revived in 1987, and is celebrated annually.  Palencia also holds the ceremony,. The tradition in the Monastery of Montserrat by L'Escolania is renowned. The festival was also revived in Chavagnes International College, a Catholic boarding school in France.

In the United States, adoptions of the custom took place in 1979 at the Cathedral of All Saints (Episcopal) in Albany, New York, as part of an annual renaissance fair on the grounds of that great Gothic church.

In recognition of diversity, in December 2009, a teenage girl from Wellingborough, England was appointed Britain's First Girl Bishop at All Saints' Church in the town.

Further reading

Recent works
A. Ward, "Richard Ramsey's Sermon for a Boy Bishop (Tudor Catholic Sermons 2)", in Ephemerides Liturgicae 111 (1997) 476–505.
A. Ward, "A Sermon for A Boy Bishop by John Alcock, Bishop of Ely (1430-1486-1500)", in Ephemerides Liturgicae 112 (1998) 58–81.
N. Mackenzie, The Medieval Boy Bishops, 2012.

Less recent
John Gough Nichols (ed.), "Two Sermons pronounced by the Boy Bishop at St. Paul's, Temp. Henry VIII, and at Gloucester, Temp. Mary", in Camden Miscellany, Volume the Seventh, Camden Society, 1875.
W.C. Meller, The Boy Bishop and other Essays on Forgotten Customs and Beliefs of the Past, London 1923, pp. 3–18
A. Gastá‚ "Les Drames liturgiques de la cathédrale de Rouen", in Revue catholique de Normandie 2 (1893) 349–372, 477–500, 573–605.
T.H.V. Motter, The School Drama in England, London 1929, pp. 6–8, 11–12, 31, 33, 49–50, 229, 252.
J.P.W. Crawford, "A Note on the Boy Bishop in Spain", in Romanic Review 12 (1921) 146–154.
Madeleine Charles, "Le drame liturgique", in La Vie et les arts liturgique 3 (1916–1917) 65–70, 121–134, 169–181, 258–266, 297–307, 403–412, esp. 404-406
J. M. J. Fletcher, The Boy Bishop at Salisbury and Elsewhere, Salisbury [1921]

Classic works on religious and liturgical drama
C.M. Gayley, Plays of our Forefathers, New York, 1907, pp. 54–61.
E.K. Chambers, The Medieval Stage, 1903, vol. 1, pp. 336–371.
R.B. Donovan, The Liturgical Drama in Medieval Spain, 1958.
H. Craig, English Religious Drama of the Middle Ages, 1955.
F. Arens (ed.) Der Liber Ordinarius der Essener Stiftskirche, Paderborn, 1908, p. 213.
J.P.W. Crawford, Spanish Drama before Lope de Vega, Philadelphia 1922 (= Publications of the University of Philadelphia, Extra Series in Languages and Literatures 7), pp. 15–16.
V. De Bartholomaeis, Le Origini della Poesia drammatica italiana, Bologna [1924], pp. 201–211

References

External links

 Chavagnes ceremony
 Hereford ceremony
 Salisbury ceremony
 Westminster ceremony
 Anglican Consortium of Country Churches' entry
 Claines Church, Worcester, Boy Bishops

Christianity and children
Massacre of the Innocents
Boys